Charles Ivars Kalme (November 15, 1939 – March 20, 2002) was a Latvian American chess master and a mathematician.

Kalme was born in Riga, Latvia on November 15, 1939. At the conclusion of World War II, Kalme and what was left of his family fled Latvia, lived for years in a Displaced persons camp in Germany and finally arrived in Philadelphia in the United States in 1951.

Kalme won the U.S. Junior Chess Championship, held in Lincoln, Nebraska, in 1955 with a 9-1 score.  He won the Pan-American Intercollegiate championship in 1957.  In 1960, he played on the U.S. Team in the World Student Team Championship in Leningrad, USSR. The U.S. team won the World Championship, the only time the U.S. has ever won that event. Kalme won two gold medals, one for the team and the other for his individual result on board two. Kalme also represented the United States twice more in team play at this level: Helsinki 1961 and Cracow 1964. He played twice in the United States Chess Championship: 1958-1959 and 1960-1961.

Kalme also became a master of contract bridge. He sometimes played as a partner of Michael Lawrence, who was a member of the world champion bridge team, the Dallas Aces.

Kalme received a Ph.D. degree in mathematics from New York University in 1967, and became a professor of mathematics at the University of California, Berkeley.

When the Republic of Latvia regained its freedom from the Soviet Union, Kalme returned to his native Latvia, where he died in 2002.

References

External links

Charles Kalme player file
Mathematics and Chess

1939 births
2002 deaths
American chess players
Latvian chess players
American contract bridge players
Sportspeople from Riga
20th-century American mathematicians
21st-century American mathematicians
New York University alumni
20th-century chess players